Lao Pak Kin (Chinese: 劉柏堅; born 24 May 1984 in Macau) is a Macau footballer.

International goals
''Scores and results are list Macau's goal tally first.

References

Macau footballers
Living people
Association football defenders
1984 births
Macau international footballers
Windsor Arch Ka I players
G.D. Lam Pak players
C.D. Monte Carlo players
Footballers at the 2006 Asian Games
Asian Games competitors for Macau
Liga de Elite players